The boys' combined competition of the alpine skiing events at the 2012 Winter Youth Olympics in Innsbruck, Austria, was held on January 15, at the Patscherkofel. 54 athletes from 46 different countries took part in this event.

Results
The race was started at 11:15.

References

Alpine skiing at the 2012 Winter Youth Olympics